"I Get It" is the second single from Chevelle's 2007 album, Vena Sera. The song was announced on the band's website to be released to radio stations on June 12, 2007.

Critical reception
Loudwire ranked it the fifth greatest Chevelle song.

Music video 
The music video for "I Get It" premiered on November 28 on MTV2 at the top of every hour they played music videos.

The video marks the first time since the band's video for "Mia" in 1999 that the band did not appear in its music video. The video was directed by Shawn Foster under the team name Citizens of Tomorrow. The concept was written by Jeff Hilliard.

The video features a man at his job (Jeff Hilliard). He is frequently picked on by his employer (Paul Hughes). He plans an elaborate scheme to get back at his boss, including dressing up as a clown, taking pictures of his boss cheating on his wife, having a mixed martial artist (played by Josh Koscheck) attack his boss, and tattooing "Mr. Perfect" into his boss's head.

The video features two comedians and fellow friends of the band, Jeff Hilliard and Paul Hughes. They play the video's main protagonist and antagonist, respectively.

Charts

Certifications

External links

Reference 

2007 singles
2006 songs
Chevelle (band) songs
Songs written by Pete Loeffler
Songs written by Sam Loeffler
Song recordings produced by Michael Baskette
Epic Records singles